A relative afferent pupillary defect (RAPD), also known as a Marcus Gunn pupil, is a medical sign observed during the swinging-flashlight test whereupon the patient's pupils dilate when a bright light is swung from the unaffected eye to the affected eye. The affected eye still senses the light and produces pupillary sphincter constriction to some degree, albeit reduced.

Depending on severity, different symptoms may appear during the swinging flash light test:

Mild RAPD will presents as a weak pupil constriction initially, after which dilation continues to happen.

When RAPD is moderate, pupil size will remain, after which it dilates

When RAPD is severe, the pupil will dilate quickly

Cause
The most common cause of Marcus Gunn pupil is a lesion of the optic nerve (between the retina and the optic chiasm) due to glaucoma, or severe retinal disease, or due to multiple sclerosis. It is named after Scottish ophthalmologist Robert Marcus Gunn.
A second common cause of Marcus Gunn pupil is a contralateral optic tract lesion, due to the different contributions of the intact nasal and temporal hemifields.

Diagnosis
The Marcus Gunn pupil is a relative afferent pupillary defect indicating a decreased pupillary response to light in the affected eye.

In the swinging flashlight test, a light is alternately shone into the left and right eyes.  A normal response would be equal constriction of both pupils, regardless of which eye the light is directed at.  This indicates an intact direct and consensual pupillary light reflex.  When the test is performed in an eye with an afferent pupillary defect, light directed in the affected eye will cause only mild constriction of both pupils (due to decreased response to light from the afferent defect), while light in the unaffected eye will cause a normal constriction of both pupils (due to an intact efferent path, and an intact consensual pupillary reflex).  Thus, light shone in the affected eye will produce less pupillary constriction than light shone in the unaffected eye.

Anisocoria is absent.  A Marcus Gunn pupil is seen, among other conditions, in optic neuritis. It is also common in retrobulbar optic neuritis due to multiple sclerosis but only for 3–4 weeks, until the visual acuity begins to improve in 1–2 weeks and may return to normal.

A total CN II lesion, in which the affected eye perceives no light, is very similar to a Marcus Gunn pupil; to distinguish them, in a CNII total lesion shining the light in the affected eye produces zero dilation nor constriction.

See also

 Argyll Robertson pupil
 Adie syndrome
 Cycloplegia
 Miosis
 Parinaud's syndrome
 Syphilis

References

External links 

Eye diseases
Human pupil